is a tram stop of Hiroshima Electric Railway located in Naka-ku, Hiroshima, Japan. The stop is on the Main Line and is the terminal of the Ujina Line.

Prior to the revision on November 1, 2001, both stops were called Kamiyachō without distinction.

References 

Hiroden Main Line stations
Hiroden Ujina Line stations
Railway stations in Japan opened in 1912